Tendai Mzungu (born 28 February 1986) is a former Australian rules footballer who played for the Fremantle Football Club and Greater Western Sydney Giants in the Australian Football League (AFL). Mzungu represented the Perth Football Club in the West Australian Football League (WAFL) before being recruited to Fremantle at the end of the 2010 season, and made his debut for the club the following season.

Career
Born in Melbourne to a Zimbabwean father and an Australian mother, Mzungu moved to Perth, Western Australia, at the age of nine. He attended Kent Street Senior High School, and played amateur football for the Trinity Aquinas Football Club. Falling into the Perth Football Club's recruitment zone in the WAFL, Mzungu made his senior debut for the club in 2006. He played 72 games over 5 years, winning the Butcher Medal Perth's best and fairest award in 2010, and polling 20 votes in the 2010 Sandover Medal.

The Fremantle Football Club obtained Mzungu in the trading period before the 2010 AFL Draft, trading their 39th selection to the new  club, in return for Mzungu and the 44th selection, after he was pre-listed by the Gold Coast as part of the new club's entry concessions. Fremantle had originally intended to rookie list him, but decided to obtain him via a trade after his good form in the 2010 WAFL season.

Mzungu performed well for Fremantle in the 2011 NAB Cup pre-season games and was tipped to replace the injured Roger Hayden in Fremantle's backline.  However, in Fremantle's final pre-season game he damaged his knee medial ligament  He returned to football 10 weeks later, to be selected directly to the AFL, rather than for Perth in the WAFL.  His debut for Fremantle was in the Round 9 match at AAMI Stadium against , which Fremantle won by 52 points. He was selected as the substitute player and only played the final quarter, replacing Hayden Ballantyne who suffered from a corked thigh (quadriceps contusion).

Tendai Mzungu played for Fremantle in the 2013 AFL Grand Final against Hawthorn, Fremantle's first ever Grand Final in their history. In the second quarter, Mzungu scored Fremantle's first goal of the game.

After playing four games for Greater Western Sydney, Mzungu announced his retirement following their preliminary final exit to the 2017 AFL season.

Mzungu has been Fremantle's team runner and inaugural Next Generation Academy coach since the 2018 AFL season.

Statistics
 Statistics are correct to the end of the 2016 season

|-
|- style="background-color: #EAEAEA"
! scope="row" style="text-align:center" | 2011
|style="text-align:center;"|
| 13 || 14 || 11 || 3 || 151 || 116 || 267 || 63 || 52 || 0.8 || 0.2 || 10.8 || 8.3 || 19.1 || 4.5 || 3.7
|-
! scope="row" style="text-align:center" | 2012
|style="text-align:center;"|
| 13 || 24 || 13 || 13 || 266 || 143 || 409 || 85 || 103 || 0.5 || 0.5 || 11.1 || 6.0 || 17.0 || 3.5 || 4.3
|- style="background-color: #EAEAEA"
! scope="row" style="text-align:center" | 2013
|style="text-align:center;"|
| 13 || 25 || 16 || 5 || 287 || 169 || 456 || 127 || 71 || 0.6 || 0.2 || 11.5 || 6.8 || 18.2 || 5.1 || 2.8
|-
! scope="row" style="text-align:center" | 2014
|style="text-align:center;"|
| 13 || 23 || 12 || 9 || 276 || 149 || 425 || 106 || 71 || 0.5 || 0.4 || 12.0 || 6.5 || 18.5 || 4.6 || 3.1
|- style="background-color: #EAEAEA"
! scope="row" style="text-align:center" | 2015
|style="text-align:center;"|
| 13 || 11 || 2 || 1 || 95 || 83 || 178 || 40 || 50 || 0.2 || 0.1 || 8.6 || 7.6 || 16.2 || 3.6 || 4.6
|-
! scope="row" style="text-align:center" | 2016
|style="text-align:center;"|
| 13 || 5 || 0 || 1 || 38 || 38 || 76 || 14 || 15 || 0.0 || 0.2 || 7.6 || 7.6 || 15.2 || 2.8 || 3.0
|- class="sortbottom"
! colspan=3| Career
! 102
! 54
! 32
! 1113
! 698
! 1811
! 435
! 362
! 0.5
! 0.3
! 10.9
! 6.8
! 17.8
! 4.3
! 3.5
|}

References

External links

WAFL Player Profile and Statistics

1986 births
Australian rules footballers from Western Australia
Australian people of Zimbabwean descent
Fremantle Football Club players
Living people
People educated at Kent Street Senior High School
Perth Football Club players
Australian rules footballers from Melbourne
Peel Thunder Football Club players
Greater Western Sydney Giants players